Thomas Zander (born 25 August 1967) is a German Greco-Roman wrestler. He won a silver medal at the 1996 Summer Olympics. Zander also won four medals at the World Wrestling Championships, including gold in 1994, and six medals at the European Wrestling Championships, including gold in 1990, 1992, 1993, and 1994.

References

External links
 

1967 births
Living people
People from Aalen
Sportspeople from Stuttgart (region)
German male sport wrestlers
Olympic wrestlers of Germany
Wrestlers at the 1992 Summer Olympics
Wrestlers at the 1996 Summer Olympics
Wrestlers at the 2000 Summer Olympics
Olympic silver medalists for Germany
Olympic medalists in wrestling
Medalists at the 1996 Summer Olympics
World Wrestling Championships medalists
European Wrestling Championships medalists
20th-century German people
21st-century German people